Levonorgestrel cyclopropylcarboxylate (developmental code name HRP-003), or levonorgestrel 17β-cyclopropylcarboxylate, is a progestin and a progestogen ester which was studied for potential use as an injectable hormonal contraceptive but was never marketed. It was developed by the World Health Organization's Special Programme on Human Reproduction in the 1980s. Analogues of levonorgestrel cyclopropylcarboxylate include levonorgestrel cyclobutylcarboxylate (HRP-001) and levonorgestrel butanoate (HRP-002).

See also
 List of progestogen esters § Esters of 19-nortestosterone derivatives
 Progestogen-only injectable contraceptive

References

Abandoned drugs
Ethynyl compounds
Androgens and anabolic steroids
Carboxylic acids
Estranes
Enones
Prodrugs
Progestogens
Progestogen esters
World Health Organization